The generalized entropy index has been proposed as a measure of income inequality in a population. It is derived from information theory as a measure of redundancy in data. In information theory a measure of  redundancy can be interpreted as  non-randomness or data compression; thus this interpretation also applies to this index. In addition, interpretation of biodiversity as entropy has also been proposed leading to uses of generalized entropy to quantify biodiversity.

Formula 

For large  the index is especially sensitive to the existence of large incomes, whereas for small  the index is especially sensitive to the existence of small incomes.  

An Atkinson index for any inequality aversion parameter can be derived from a generalized entropy index under the restriction that  - i.e an Atkinson index with high inequality aversion is derived from a GE index with small . Moreover, it is the unique class of inequality measures that is a monotone transformation of the Atkinson index and which is additive decomposable. Many popular indices, including Gini index, do not satisfy additive decomposability.

The formula for deriving an Atkinson index with inequality aversion parameter  under the restriction  is given by:

Note that the generalized entropy index has several income inequality metrics as special cases. For example, GE(0) is the mean log deviation, GE(1) is the Theil index, and GE(2) is half the squared coefficient of variation.

See also 
 Atkinson index
 Gini coefficient
 Hoover index (a.k.a. Robin Hood index)
 Income inequality metrics
 Lorenz curve
 Rényi entropy
 Suits index
 Theil index

References

Income inequality metrics
Information theory